Guido Maria Dreves (27 October 1854  – 1 June 1909) was a German Jesuit, hymnologist and hymnwriter. He was the son of the notary and poet Lebrecht Blücher Dreves.

Life 
Dreves was born in Hamburg. He already had contact with Jesuits at school, as he attended the Stella Matutina grammar school in Feldkirch from 1861. After completing his education, he immediately entered the Jesuit order in November 1869. He devoted his research mainly to medieval Latin hymnody.

He is especially important as the author and editor of the Analecta hymnica medii aevi, the largest collection of medieval Latin poetry to date (hymns, sequences, tropes, rhyming offices and psalters). With astonishing diligence, Dreves searched libraries all over Europe for old manuscripts and incunables. From 1886 to 1926, 55 volumes of Analecta were published, from volume 25 onwards Clemens Blume co-editor.

Dreves died in Mitwitz bei Kronach (Oberfranken) at the age of 54.

Works 
 Stimmen durch den Lenz (poems). 1881
 O Christ hie merk! Ein Gesangbüchlein geistlicher Lieder. (sacred songs) 1885
 Analecta hymnica medii aevi. 55 volumes. 1886–1926 (Reprint: Minerva, Frankfurt 1961; digital: Rauner, Augsburg 2004–2005, via 
 Aurelius Ambrosius, der Vater des Kirchengesanges. Eine hymnologische Studie. 1893 (Neudruck Grüner, Amsterdam 1968)
 Schwert-Lilien. Sagen und Gesch. des Hohen Deutschen Ordens. 1898
 Ein Jahrtausend lateinischer Hymnendichtung. 1909 (2 volumes, published posthumously by Christian Blume)

The Gotteslob hymnal contains his songs:
 "Gelobt seist du, Herr Jesu Christ" (375)
 "Ein Danklied sei dem Herrn" (382)
 "Sagt an, wer ist doch diese" (531)

References

Further reading 
 
 Rebecca Schmidt: Gegen den Reiz der Neuheit. Katholische Restauration im 19. Jahrhundert: Heinrich Bone, Joseph Mohr, Guido Maria Dreves (Mainzer hymnologische Studien. Bd. 15). Francke, Tübingen 2005,  (Zugl.: Mainz, Univ., Diss., 2002).

External links 
 
 
 Dreves, Guido Maria on BMLO
 
 Index zur Analecta hymnica
 Zugang zur Analecta hymnica
 Access with national licence

19th-century German Jesuits
20th-century German Jesuits
German Roman Catholic hymnwriters
19th-century German Roman Catholic priests
20th-century German Roman Catholic priests
1854 births
1909 deaths
People from Hamburg